Guk Darreh (also Romanized as Gūk Darreh; also known as Gūg Darreh) is a village in Maraveh Tappeh Rural District, in the Central District of Maraveh Tappeh County, Golestan Province, Iran. At the 2006 census, its population was 745, in 154 families.

References 

Populated places in Maraveh Tappeh County